The Constitution of East Germany refers to the constitution of the German Democratic Republic, commonly known as East Germany. Its original constitution was promulgated on 7 October 1949. It was heavily based on the "Weimarer Reichsverfassung", (Weimar Constitution) and nominally established the GDR as a liberal democratic republic. In 1968 the East German government adopted a new, fully Communist constitution that was based on Marxism-Leninism, political unitarism, and collective leadership. There were further amendments to the 1968 constitution in 1974. With the political events of 1989, there were attempts to draft a new constitution for East Germany, but these efforts never materialized due to the dissolution of East Germany and the accession of its Länder (or states) into the neighboring Federal Republic.

Background

In 1947 the German People's Congress met in Berlin. The People's Congress was meant to be an alternative to the Western London Conference of Foreign Ministers taking place at the same time. The People's Congress' aim was to establish an assembly which would represent the entire German nation and determine the nation's political future and prevent the division of post-war Germany. In all there were 2215 delegates sent to the congress (664 of whom represented Germans in zones occupied by the Western Powers). The second Congress, which had by this point been outlawed in Western occupied zones, met a year later and elected a Council (Volksrat). This council would seek to serve as an assembly representing the entire country, irrespective of occupying nation. This assembly designated a committee whose task it was to develop a constitution. Future Minister-President Otto Grotewohl was the chairman of this committee. An election was held in May 1949 to designate a People's Council. The German People's Congress met for a third time in 1949 and accepted the drafted constitution. The People's Council then became the People's Chamber of the East German Republic, and the Peoples' Congress was reformed into the National Front political bloc.

1949 constitution

Fundamentals of State Authority

The constitution begins by declaring the indivisibility of the German people as a nationality, and primacy of the Laender (states) in politics. The federal government is to be limited in its authority to issues which affect the whole of the nation, all other affairs falling to the states. Berlin is declared as the capital of the Republic.

The people are declared as the true source of political authority. Citizens therefore have the right to engage in political life at the local, county, and national level. This participation includes the right to vote in elections, referendums, and initiatives. Citizens also have the right to stand for election, and have the right to enter into public life whether it be political office or in the administration of justice. Citizens also have the right to petition the government.

Due to the authority emanating from the people, the constitution states the government must serve the common welfare of the people. This includes their personal liberty, providing for the general peace, and protecting democracy. Those people who are elected to office are ultimately responsible to their representative body and not to their individual party.

The constitution of the Republic is declared as the basis for all governmental action and the government must abide by its principles. The people have the right to resist any action which takes place outside of these principles. The people of the Republic and the government are also subject to international laws and statutes.

The Rights of the Citizen

The second section of the constitution deals with the rights of citizens. All citizens are declared equal before the law. However a citizen convicted of a felony is disqualified from certain rights and privileges, including the right to vote and hold public office. Gender equality is enshrined and any law which limits the equality of women is abolished.

Citizens have the right to personal liberty, privacy of the home and of the mail, and the right to live where they choose. Citizens have the right to freedom of expression within constitutionally applicable laws. This includes the freedom to assemble peacefully and unarmed. No person shall have these freedoms infringed based on their employment.

The constitution declares the freedom of the press from censorship. No citizen may be extradited, nor can non-citizens be extradited provided they are engaged in struggle similar in principle to the constitution. Citizens have the right to emigrate, and any changes to this law must be applicable to the whole nation and not on an individual basis. People have the right to free ethnic education and development. No person shall be deprived of using their native language in the judicial system, education, or politics.

Citizens are free to form societies and associations. Associations which are aligned with constitutional principles and which support democracy may be permitted to stand candidates for election.

The people have a right to labor organizing, and recognized trade unions have the right to call a strike action. The right to work is guaranteed. Every worker is entitled to recreation, annual vacation leave, sick leave and old age pension. Sundays, holidays, and May 1st are protected by law as days of rest. Citizens also have by right social insurance which provides for health, old age assistance, motherhood assistance, disability, etc. These rights shall be exercised through trade unions and work councils. All people have the right to a social insurance which provides for health, old age assistance, motherhood assistance, disability assistance, etc.

The Economic Order

The economy of the Republic is to be structured from the principles of social justice and the need to provide all people with an existence of human dignity. The constitution declares the economy must benefit the whole people and that each person will receive their fair share of the yield of production. Free enterprise is permitted as long as it fits within this scope.

The government will support co-operatives and the development of farmers, traders, and craftsmen. The economy is to be overseen by legislative bodies and it is the task of public officials to supervise and implement this economic plan. Private property is guaranteed by the state if it can exist within this scope. Inheritance is also guaranteed with inheritance tax being determined by law. Any restrictions on private property must be imposed only for the benefit of the general public.

Property and enterprises owned by war profiteers and Nazis is to be appropriated by the state without compensation. All monopolistic enterprises which seek to control production are to be abolished and prohibited. Large estates over 100 hectares are to be dissolved and redistributed without compensation.

Farmers are guaranteed ownership of their land, and intellectual workers are guaranteed rights by the state.

All mineral and exploitable resources are to be transferred to public ownership. The state shall ensure their use for the benefit of the whole of society. 

Every citizen and family is entitled to a healthy and suitable dwelling. Considerations shall be made for victims of fascism, resettled people, severely disabled people, etc.

Property and income shall be progressively taxed with consideration made for family obligations.

Family and Motherhood

The constitution declares the family as being the foundation of collective life and is thus protected by the state. All laws pertaining to the family which undermine the equality of women are abrogated. During a woman's pregnancy she has the right to maternal care and protection from the state. The constitution outlines that institutions which protect a mother and children in their rights are to be created. Extramarital birth cannot not be ground for discrimination in any way, whether against the child or parents. Any former laws which go against this mandate are abrogated.

Education
Every citizen has an equal right to an education, may freely choose their vocation, and the teaching of art and science shall be free. 
The Laender will establish public school systems and the logistics for their operation, the Republic shall issue legislation to outline their basic function, and provide for the training of teachers.

It is the duty of the school to educate the students in the spirit of democracy and culture, to the end of making them responsible individuals who take part in their community. Parents shall be involved in the educational system through parent's councils.

Education is compulsory until the end of a student's 18th year. After finishing primary school, students will enter into with vocational/training or public schools. All students will also be afforded an opportunity to prepare for their admission to university through use of preparatory schools. These rights are extended to all the population.

Education is to be free. This means tuition, all text books, and instruction material that is used in compulsory education is to be furnished without cost. Scholarships will be provided to students as well based on need.

Religious education is reserved for religious institutions. These institutions are guaranteed the right to conduct religious education.

Organization of State Authority

Popular Representative Body

Supreme governmental authority is vested in the Volkskammer. The members of the Volkskammer are the representatives of the German people and are to be elected in universal, equal, direct elections on a secret ballot. The term for these representatives is four years, and seats will be allocated according to proportional representation. The size of the Volkskammer is to be 400 members. Freedom of the ballot and secrecy of the ballot are guaranteed.

All citizens over 18 years of age are eligible to vote and citizens over 21 years of age are permitted to stand for election.

The President will convene the assembly no later than 30 days after an election. Elections must take place no later than 60 days after a legislative term. In order for the assembly to dissolve (of its own power) more than half of the assembly must consent.

The Volkskammer will elect a Presidium. The Presidium will stay in office until the next legislative section. When the assembly is not in session 3 committees are to be elected to maintain government functioning, the Committee of General Affairs, the Committee of Economic and Financial affairs, and the Committee of Foreign Affairs.

A quorum consists of at least half members being present. Unless the constitution says otherwise legislation will be adopted by majority vote.

The deliberations of the assembly are open to the public unless two thirds of the assembly request an exclusion.

The functions of the Volkskammer are:
Determine the principles of policy, and the implementation of policy
The confirmation, supervision, and ability to recall parliament
Determine administrative policies and the ultimate supervision of government agencies
Legislate, except in the event of referendums
Control of the Republic's finances, including the national budget, economic planning, loans and credit of the government, and ratifying treaties
Granting amnesty
Electing the President of the Republic (along with the Länderkammer), the election and recall of the members of the Supreme Court and the Prosecutor General

The Volkskammer will also convene a Constitutional Committee. This committee will represent all political parties (proportional membership of the committee corresponding to the composition of the Volkskammer), three members of the Supreme Court, three German professors of constitutional law who are not also members of the Volkskammer. The Constitutional Committee is the only authority which is allowed to review the constitutionality of legislation. If half of members of the assembly question the constitutionality of a law it can be reviewed. The Volkskammer confirms any decision of the Constitutional Committee.

Laender

The Laender will be represented in a legislative chamber known as the Chamber of States (Länderkammer). Each Laender will be represented by at least one member and there will be one representative for every five hundred thousand inhabitants. These representatives will be elected by the legislatures of the Laender (Landtag). This will be done proportionally to the strength of the political parties represented within these legislatures. These representatives will be drawn from the members of these Laender parliaments, their terms will correspond to the terms of the parliaments. The members shall represent the wishes of their respective Laendar but will follow freely their own conscience.

The chamber will elect a Presidium, consisting of the President, the deputies, and associate members. The President shall convene the chamber whenever it is necessary, or when one fifth of the members wish to.

The meetings of the chamber will be open to the public, certain agenda topics may necessitate exclusion of the public.
All decisions will be decided by majority vote, unless the constitution declares otherwise.

The Länderkammer may introduce legislation to the Volkskammer and may reject legislation from the Volkskammer. The Volkskammer and Länderkammer may present their opinion to the other chamber.

1968 constitution

At the Seventh Party Congress of the SED in April 1967, Ulbricht called for a new constitution, declaring that the existing constitution no longer accorded "with the relations of socialist society and the present level of historical development". A new constitution was needed to conform with the Marxist–Leninist belief in the progression of history and the role of the working class led by the SED. The new constitution would also reflect the role of the state as the party's main instrument in achieving the goal of a socialist and eventually communist society. A commission in the Volkskammer was tasked in December 1967 to draft a new constitution. Two months later the commission produced a document, which, after "public debate", was submitted to a plebiscite on April 6, 1968. Approved by a 94.5 percent margin, the new Constitution went into effect three days later on 9 April 1968.

While the 1949 constitution was at least superficially a liberal democratic document, the 1968 constitution was a fully Communist document. Modeled closely on the 1936 Soviet Constitution, it integrated all the constitutional changes that had taken place since 1949 into a new "socialist" framework, but it reduced certain rights provided in the earlier version. Article 1 of the 1968 constitution began with the words, "The German Democratic Republic is a socialist state of the German nation. It is the political organization of the workers in the cities and in the countryside, who jointly under the leadership of the working class and their Marxist-Leninist party will realize Socialism."

While the old document made no mention of the SED, Article 1 of the new constitution unequivocally declared that "the leadership of the state is to be exercised through the working class and its Marxist-Leninist party"—the SED. The 1949 constitution had declared Germany a "democratic republic", whereas the new one described East Germany as a "socialist state of the German nation". Under the old constitution, power derived from "the people", while Article 2 of the new Constitution stated that power emanated from "the worker in city and country".

Significant changes introduced into the 1968 document included:

 Article 6, which committed the state to adhere to the "principles of socialist internationalism" and to devote special attention to its "fraternal ties" with the Soviet Union
 Article 9, which based the national economy on the "socialist ownership of the means of production"
 Article 20, which granted freedom of conscience and belief
 Article 21, which maintained that the "basic rights" of citizenship were inseparably linked with "corresponding obligations"
 Article 47, which declared that the principle of "democratic centralism" is the authoritative maxim for the construction of the socialist state

The 1968 document effectively codified the actual state of affairs that had prevailed in the GDR for two decades. It was one of Ulbricht's last significant victories before his ouster in 1971.

1974 amendments

With the rise of Erich Honecker in May 1971 and the increasing international recognition of the GDR, the regime attempted to abandon the concept that the GDR was the sole legitimate government of the entire German nation.  Instead, the policy of Abgrenzung (demarcation) was instituted, with the desired effect of creating a separate GDR national identity.  As a result, the 1968 constitution was amended by the Volkskammer on 27 September 1974 to delete the reference to the German nation; indeed, the use of the word "German" was cut back almost to a bare minimum. The amended document increased the emphasis on solidarity and friendship with the Soviet Union. In practice, however, ties between East Germans and their West German countrymen increased, in part due to the policies of Ostpolitik and détente followed by both East and West during the 1970s.

Article 1 of the 1974 constitution began with the words, "The German Democratic Republic is a socialist state of workers and farmers. It is the political organization of the workers in the cities and in the countryside under the leadership of the working class and their Marxist-Leninist party."

1989–90 proposals
In the wake of the Peaceful Revolution and the fall of the Berlin Wall, the constitution was significantly revised in November 1989 to prune out its Communist character.  Most notably, Article 1, which effectively gave the SED a monopoly of power, was deleted.

In April 1990, the democratic forum Runder Tisch (Round Table) developed a proposal for a new GDR constitution to reflect the democratic changes that swept across the GDR.  However, by that time, the newly freely-elected Volkskammer (parliament) was moving in the direction of outright unification with the Federal Republic, and so the draft constitution went nowhere.

See also

Constitutions of Germany
 Constitution of the German Empire (1871–1919)
 Weimar Constitution (1919–1933)
 Basic Law for the Federal Republic of Germany (Federal Republic of Germany, 1949–)

Others
History of East Germany

References
 "Constitution of the German Democratic Republic (7 October 1949)" United States Department of State, 7 March 2015. Web. Constitution of the German Democratic Republic (7 October 1949)

External links
1949 Constitution of the GDR (full text in German)
1949 Constitution of the GDR (full text in English)
1968 Constitution of the GDR (full text in German)
Excerpts from the 1968 Constitution (in English)
1974 Constitution of the GDR (full text in German)
1990 Proposed draft of a new GDR constitution (full text in German)
East Germany – Constitution of 1949

Government of East Germany
East German law
East Germany
1949 in East Germany
1968 in East Germany
1974 in East Germany
Constitutions of Germany
1949 in politics
1968 in politics
1974 in politics
1949 in law
1968 in law
1974 in law
1949 documents
1968 documents